Mezensky (masculine), Mezenskaya (feminine), or Mezenskoye (neuter) may refer to:
Mezensky District, a district of Arkhangelsk Oblast
Mezensky Uyezd, an administrative division in the Russian Empire and the early Russian SFSR; most recently (1922–1929) a part of Arkhangelsk Governorate
Mezenskoye Urban Settlement, a municipal formation which the town of Mezen and five rural localities in Mezensky District of Arkhangelsk Oblast, Russia are incorporated as
Mezensky (inhabited locality) (Mezenskaya, Mezenskoye), several rural localities in Russia